Conopholis americana, the American cancer-root, bumeh or bear corn, is a perennial, non-photosynthesizing (or "achlorophyllous") parasitic plant. It is from the family Orobanchaceae and more recently from the genus Conopholis but also listed as Orobanche, native but not endemic to North America. When blooming, it resembles a pine cone or cob of corn growing from the roots of mostly oak and beech trees.

Description
Conopholis americana is parasitic on the roots of woody plants, especially oaks (genus Quercus) and beech (genus Fagus). The only part of the plant generally seen is the cone-shaped inflorescence, which appears above ground in spring. The entire structure is a yellowish color, turning to brown.

Stems and leaves

Flowers
Conopholis americana produces spikes of yellow to cream flowers densely crowded all around the stem. As the flowering spike matures it begins to wither and becomes brown throughout the summer and often persisting through the winter, by which time it has become shriveled and black. There is no noticeable floral scent.

Fruits and reproduction
Each flower is replaced by a seed capsule that is longer than it is wide and contains many small seeds. This plant spreads to new locations by reseeding itself.

Roots
The root system is parasitic on the roots of oak trees (Quercus spp.); dependent on the host tree for its nourishment, the suckers of the parasitic roots cause the formation of large rounded knobs on the roots of the host tree.

Distribution
The plant is found growing on roots in wooded ravines in every state of the United States east of the Mississippi River. While widely distributed, it is uncommon. 

Native:
Nearctic:
Northern America:
Eastern Canada: Nova Scotia, Ontario, Quebec
Northeastern U.S.A.: Connecticut, Indiana, Maine, Massachusetts, Michigan, New Hampshire, New Jersey, New York, Ohio, Pennsylvania, Rhode Island, Vermont, West Virginia
North-Central U.S.A.: Illinois, Wisconsin
Southeastern U.S.A.: Alabama, Delaware, Florida, Georgia, Kentucky, Maryland, North Carolina, South Carolina, Tennessee, Virginia

It is considered an exploitably vulnerable species in New York, a threatened species in New Hampshire and a special concern in Rhode Island.

References

External links

Orobanchaceae
Flora of the Eastern United States
Flora of Canada
Flora of the Appalachian Mountains
Plants described in 1767
Taxa named by Carl Linnaeus